Platycorynus compressicornis is a species of beetles belonging to the Chrysomelidae family. This species can be found in tropical Africa.

Distribution
P. compressicornis is distributed throughout west, central and east Africa, including the Congo. It is found on bushes at the edge of dense gallery forest.

References

 The African Eumolpinae site
 Zipcodezoo

Beetles described in 1801
Taxa named by Johan Christian Fabricius
Eumolpinae
Beetles of Africa
Beetles of the Democratic Republic of the Congo
Insects of West Africa